The Canton of Dieppe-Ouest is a former canton situated in the Seine-Maritime département and in the Haute-Normandie region of northern France. It was disbanded following the French canton reorganisation which came into effect in March 2015. It consisted of part of the commune of Dieppe and had a total of 19,048 inhabitants (2012).

Geography 
A fishing and light industrial area in the arrondissement of Dieppe, centred on the town of Dieppe.

See also 
 Arrondissements of the Seine-Maritime department
 Cantons of the Seine-Maritime department
 Communes of the Seine-Maritime department

References

Dieppe-Ouest
2015 disestablishments in France
States and territories disestablished in 2015